The 7th Annual Indonesian Movie Awards was held on May 27, 2013, at the Studio 8 RCTI, West Jakarta. The award show was hosted by Choky Sitohang and Tamara Geraldine. And the nominations have been announced for the category of Favorite, which will be chosen by the public via SMS. As for the category of Best, will be selected by a jury that has been appointed. As a guest star who will fill the event, among them Ahmad Dhani, Bebi Romeo, Rossa, Bunga Citra Lestari, 3Composer, and the participants of X Factor Indonesia.

Belenggu leads the nominations with nine nominations, with Rectoverso and Habibie & Ainun followed behind with eight and seven nominations each. In the night ceremonies, Rectoverso and Habibie & Ainun were biggest winner with receiving three awards trophies each. Followed behind by film Belenggu success taking home two awards.

Aminah Cendrakasih received a Lifetime Achievement Award, the first to be awarded by the Indonesian Movie Awards.

Performers

Presenters
 Joanna Alexandra, Kimberly Ryder and Maudy Ayunda – Presented Favorite Newcomer Actor
 Denny Sumargo and Igor Saykoji – Presented Best Newcomer Actor
 Coboy Junior – Presented Best Children Role
 Marcell Domits and Eriska Rein – Presented Favorite Newcomer Actress
 Asrul Dahlan and Olivia Jensen Lubis – Presented Best Newcomer Actress
 Reza Rahadian and Bunga Citra Lestari – Presented Best Supporting Actress
 Ayushita and Acha Septriasa – Presented Best Supporting Actor
 Raffi Ahmad and Laudya Cynthia Bella – Presented Best Chemistry
 Bebi Romeo, Rossa and Ahmad Dhani – Presented Favorite Soundtrack
 Henidar Amroe and Meriam Bellina – Presented Favorite Actor
 Adipati Koesmadji and Laura Basuki – Presented Favorite Actress
 Adinia Wirasti and Atiqah Hasiholan – Presented Best Actress
 Slamet Rahardjo and Donny Damara – Presented Best Actor
 Didi Petet – Presented Lifetime Achievement Award
 Eros Djarot and Ikranegara – Presented Favorite Film

Nominees and winners

Best
Winners are listed first and highlighted in boldface.

Favorite
Winners are listed first and highlighted in boldface.

Film with most nominations and awards

Most nominations

The following film received most nominations:

Most wins
The following film received most nominations:

References

External links
 Situs web resmi IMA 2013

Indonesian
2013 in Indonesia
Indonesian Movie Actor Awards